John Shaw Waring (born 1 October 1942) is an English former professional cricketer who played for Yorkshire County Cricket Club from 1963 to 1966. He also played one match for Warwickshire in 1967. He was born in Ripon.

Waring was a right-arm fast-medium bowler who took 55 wickets in 29 first-class matches at an average of 22.74 runs per wicket. He took five wickets in an innings twice with best figures of 7/40 against Lancashire at Headingley in 1966. He achieved ten wickets in a match once, by taking 10/63 in the same match against Lancashire. A right-handed tail-end batsman, he scored 152 career runs with a highest score of 26. He was generally an outfielder and completed 17 catches.

Cricket career
Born in Ripon, John Waring played in 28 first-class matches for Yorkshire County Cricket Club from 1963 to 1966, and one match for Warwickshire in 1967. He also played in one Gillette Cup match for Yorkshire in 1965. In other matches, he played for the Yorkshire Second XI from 1961 to 1966, the Minor Counties in 1966, Cumberland from 1970 to 1973, and for both the Nottinghamshire Second XI and the Surrey Second XI in 1967. A right-arm fast-medium bowler, Waring took 55 wickets at 22.74, with a best return of 7 for 40 against Lancashire in a 1966 Roses Match at Headingley; his match return of 10/63 was the only time he achieved ten wickets in a match. He scored 152 runs with a highest score of 26, at an average of 10.85. He held 17 catches in the field. He did not take a wicket in one-day cricket.

Waring sometimes opened the Yorkshire bowling in combination with Fred Trueman. Journalist Chris Waters wrote a biography of Trueman and, as part of his research, calculated that Trueman had opened Yorkshire's bowling in 802 innings with 28 "new ball partners". Waring is fourteenth in this list with eight; the leaders are Tony Nicholson (188), Mel Ryan (126) and Bob Appleyard (101).

References

Sources
 Wisden Cricketers' Almanack, 101st edition, editor Norman Preston, Sporting Handbooks Ltd, 1964
 Playfair Cricket Annual, 17th to 21st editions, editor Gordon Ross, Playfair Books, 1964–1968

External links
 

1942 births
Living people
Cricketers from Ripon
Cumberland cricketers
English cricketers
Warwickshire cricketers
Yorkshire cricketers